Conmigo may refer to:

"Conmigo" (song), 2015 song by Kendji Girac
Baila Conmigo (disambiguation)
Ven Conmigo (disambiguation)